Downton was a parliamentary borough in Wiltshire, which elected two Members of Parliament (MPs) to the House of Commons from 1295 until 1832, when it was abolished by the Great Reform Act.

History
The borough consisted of part of the parish of Downton, a small town six miles south of Salisbury. By the 19th century, only about half of the town was within the boundaries of the borough, and the more prosperous section was excluded: at the 1831 census the borough had 166 houses and a tax assessment of £70, whereas the whole town consisted of 314 houses, and was assessed at £273.

Downton was a burgage borough, meaning that the right to vote rested solely with the freeholders of 100 specified properties or "burgage tenements"; it was not necessary to be resident on the tenement, or even in the borough, to exercise this right. Indeed, some of the tenements could not realistically be occupied, and one was in the middle of a watercourse. At the time of the Great Reform Act, The Earl of Radnor (who supported the Reform) told the House of Lords that he owned 99 of the 100 tenements — which, of course, gave him absolute power in choosing both the borough's MPs. Earlier, in the 18th century, the Duncombe family had been the owners.

Corruption was rife at 18th century elections in Downton, and the House of Commons at one point proposed to "throw it into the hundred", that is to extend the boundaries to include the whole of the Hundred of Downton and to abolish the restrictive franchise — one of the earliest examples of such a proposal being debated; however, the proposal was not adopted.

Although there was supposedly a property qualification to become an MP (borough MPs were required to have an annual income of at least £300 derived from the ownership of land), this was routinely ignored or evaded, and Downton offers a rare example of an English election being re-run because the victor lacked the qualification. On 11 June 1826 the poet Southey was elected MP for Downton, but he did not take his seat when Parliament assembled in July, and in November wrote to the Speaker: 'Having while I was on the continent been, without my knowledge, elected a burgess to serve in the present Parliament for the borough of Downton, it has become my duty to take the earliest opportunity of requesting you to inform the honourable House that I am not qualified to take a seat therein, inasmuch as I am not possessed of such an estate as is required by the Act passed in the ninth year of Queen Anne.' A by-election had to be held to replace him.

By 1831 the parish of Downton had a population of around 450, too small to retain representation after the Reform Act, and yet in the original Reform Bill it was proposed that Downton should lose only one of its two members, its boundaries being extended to include Fordingbridge, over the county border in Hampshire. However, the Earl of Radnor pushed for its complete disfranchisement as it would be too difficult to make even an extended borough free of the influence of himself and his family. (He also made it a condition of becoming MP for Downton that its members should vote for its abolition.) As this abolition of a Whig-owned borough was useful to the Whig government in demonstrating their even-handedness, they backed an amendment to move Downton into Schedule A, the list of boroughs that were to lose both seats; but the government majority in the Commons fell to 30 in the vote on the amendment, the narrowest of all the votes on the details of the eventual Act.

The Reform Act being passed, Downton ceased to be represented from the 1832 general election, those of its residents who were qualified voting instead in the county constituency of Southern Wiltshire.

Members of Parliament

MPs 1295–1640

MPs 1640–1832

Notes

References
Robert Beatson, A Chronological Register of Both Houses of Parliament (London: Longman, Hurst, Res & Orme, 1807) 
 Michael Brock, The Great Reform Act (London: Hutchinson, 1973)
 D Brunton & D H Pennington, Members of the Long Parliament (London: George Allen & Unwin, 1954)
Cobbett's Parliamentary history of England, from the Norman Conquest in 1066 to the year 1803 (London: Thomas Hansard, 1808) 
 J Holladay Philbin, Parliamentary Representation 1832 — England and Wales (New Haven: Yale University Press, 1965)
 Edward Porritt and Annie G Porritt, The Unreformed House of Commons (Cambridge University Press, 1903)
 Woodford, A.R. Notes on the history of Downton, collected and arranged (Downton, nd)
 

Parliamentary constituencies in Wiltshire (historic)
Constituencies of the Parliament of the United Kingdom established in 1295
Constituencies of the Parliament of the United Kingdom disestablished in 1832
Rotten boroughs